Fatima Dike, also known as Fatts Dike (born 13 September 1948) is a South African playwright and theatre director. After writing The Sacrifice of Kreli in 1976, she became the first black South African woman to have a play published.

Life
Royline Fatima Dike was born in Langa, Cape Town on 13 September 1948. She was educated at Langa church schools until the government took them over in the 1950s. She was later sent to boarding school run by Irish nuns in Rustenburg.

After leaving school she had a variety of jobs, including work in a steakhouse, a butcher's shop, a bookshop and a supermarket. In 1972 she volunteered at the non-racial Space Theatre in Cape Town, where she was encouraged to write The Sacrifice of Kreli, about a king who takes himself into exile rather than be enslaved by the British.

From 1979 to 1983 she lived in the United States, participating in a writers' conference at the University of Iowa and working with theatre groups in New York City. She took courses at New York University, though when she enrolled in a playwriting class with Ed Bullins he told her she was too experienced to be in his class.

Dike lives in Langa.

Plays
 The Sacrifice of Kreli. Xhosa and English, 1976.
 The First South African, 1977
 The Crafty Tortoise, 1978
 Glass House, 1979
 So What's New?, 1991
 Streetwalking and Company Valet Service, 2000

References

South African dramatists and playwrights
South African women writers
1948 births
Living people